Information Services Corporation (ISC) is a publicly traded Canadian multinational that offers registry and information management services. It operates as a parent company to three subsidiaries: ISC Enterprise Inc, ESC Corporate Services Ltd, and Enterprise Registry Solutions Ltd.

Activities
ISC holds a Master Service Agreement with the Government of Saskatchewan, which has been effective for 20 years and is valid until 2033. The agreement pertains to the Saskatchewan Land Registry, Personal Property Registry, Corporate Registry, Common Business Identifier Program, and Business Registration Saskatchewan Program.

In 2015, ISC acquired ESC Corporate Services Ltd.

In 2017, ISC acquired Enterprise Registry Solutions Ltd., an Ireland-based registry technology company that develops and implements registry technology solutions.

ISC currently employs 400 people in Saskatchewan, Ontario, Quebec, British Columbia, and Ireland.

Services

Land Registry 
The Land Registry includes the Saskatchewan Land Titles Registry, Saskatchewan Land Surveys Directory and Saskatchewan Geomatics services.

Personal Property Registry 
ISC houses and maintains the Saskatchewan Personal Property Registry.

Corporate Registry 
In 2010, ISC and the province of Saskatchewan collaborated to create a Corporate Registry. Records on all Saskatchewan businesses are maintained and made available to the public through the Corporate Registry.

References

External links
 

Canadian companies established in 2000
Companies based in Regina, Saskatchewan
Companies listed on the Toronto Stock Exchange
2000 establishments in Saskatchewan